Triodopsis tridentata, common name the northern three-tooth or northern threetooth, is a species of air-breathing land snail, a terrestrial pulmonate gastropod mollusk in the family Polygyridae.

References

Polygyridae
Gastropods described in 1816
Taxa named by Thomas Say